Thomas Tasman Thompson Long (11 September 1875 – 20 October 1926) was an Australian cricketer. He played in four first-class matches for Queensland between 1896 and 1905. In his career he was licensee of the Oriental Hotel and Long's Hotel. In his personal life he attended Brisbane Grammar School, had four children, and was brother of Alderman R.W.H. Long.

See also
 List of Queensland first-class cricketers

References

External links
 

1875 births
1926 deaths
Australian cricketers
Queensland cricketers
Cricketers from Brisbane